Lika can refer to:


Geography
 Lika, a historic region of Croatia
 Sanjak of Lika, a province (sanjak) of the Ottoman Empire, during the 16th and 17th centuries
 Lika (river), a river in the eponymous region of Croatia

People
 Lika (name), a list of people with the given name or surname
 Lika MC, Russian-Lithuanian musician

Other uses
 , an Austro-Hungarian Navy destroyer
 Lika sheep, a Croatian breed of sheep
 Lika language, a Bantu language in the Democratic Republic of the Congo

See also
 Licia (disambiguation)